Gmina Wąsosz may refer to either of the following administrative districts in Poland:
Gmina Wąsosz, Lower Silesian Voivodeship
Gmina Wąsosz, Podlaskie Voivodeship